Pibrentasvir is an NS5A inhibitor antiviral agent.  In the United States and Europe, it is approved for use with glecaprevir as the combination drug glecaprevir/pibrentasvir (trade name Mavyret in the US and Maviret in the EU) for the treatment of hepatitis C. It is  sold by Abbvie.

References 

NS5A inhibitors
Fluoroarenes
Benzimidazoles
AbbVie brands
Carbamates